Mary-Ann Kirkby (born 1959) is a Canadian author who has written two memoirs about her upbringing in the Hutterite tradition.

Early life
Kirkby was born on a Hutterite colony in Manitoba to Ronald and Mary Dornn. Her family left the colony in 1969 when Kirkby was ten years old due to a conflict between Kirkby's father and the colony's head minister. Kirkby studied broadcast journalism in college, eventually becoming a television reporter and singer.

Books
Kirkby has written two books about her Hutterite upbringing. I Am Hutterite was originally self-published in 2007, earning enough commercial and critical success to lead to a 2010 re-release by publishers Key Porter Books in Canada and Thomas Nelson in the United States. The follow up, Secrets of a Hutterite Kitchen, was published in 2014.  Kirkby won the 2007 Saskatchewan Book Award for Non-fiction and the Gold Prize for Best Culinary Narrative at the 2015 Taste Canada Food Writing Awards.  Kirkby has also co-written a children's book entitled Make a Rabbit, which she self-published in 2010.

Personal life
She is married to Gordon Kirkby, a politician.

References

External links
 Polka Dot Press
 Mary-Ann Kirkby on the Secrets of a Hutterite Kitchen

1959 births
Living people
Hutterite people
Hutterites in Canada
Writers from Manitoba
Canadian memoirists
Canadian women memoirists